Marieke van Wanroij (born 5 July 1979) is a Dutch professional racing cyclist.

See also
 2014 Boels Dolmans Cycling Team season

References

External links

1979 births
Living people
Dutch female cyclists
Sportspeople from Nijmegen
Cyclists from Gelderland